Ees is a village in the Dutch province of Drenthe. It is a part of the municipality of Borger-Odoorn, and lies about 17 km north of Emmen.

The village was first mentioned in 1263 as de Ese, and means "farmland around a village".

Situated close to the town of Borger, Ees retains a provincial charm that is characterised by pleasant homes and a large expanse of woodland to the South East. A network of bike paths and horse trails (ruiterpads) throughout the woods provides for some peaceful treks.

References

Populated places in Drenthe
Borger-Odoorn